Ascothoracidae is a family of crustaceans belonging to the order Dendrogastrida.

Genera:
 Ascothorax Djakonov, 1914
 Cardiosaccus Kolbasov & Petrunina, 2018

References

Maxillopoda
Crustacean families